4th National Assembly may refer to:

 4th National Assembly at Argos
 4th National Assembly of France
 4th National Assembly of Laos
 4th National Assembly of Namibia
 4th National Assembly of Nigeria
 4th National Assembly of Pakistan
 4th National Assembly of Serbia